Allyn McKeen (January 26, 1905 – September 13, 1978) was an American college football player and coach. He served as the head football coach at West Tennessee State Normal School—now known as the University of Memphis—from 1937 to 1938 and Mississippi State College—now known as Mississippi State University—from 1939 to 1948, compiling a career head coaching record of 78–25–3. He was inducted into the College Football Hall of Fame as a coach in 1991.

Playing career
McKeen played football as a guard and end at the University of Tennessee from 1925 to 1927, where he earned all-state honors. He was also the captain of the men's basketball and track teams. He helped preserve the tie with Vanderbilt by covering Bill Spears's receivers.

Coaching career
From 1937 to 1938, McKeen coached at West Tennessee State Teachers College, now known as the University of Memphis, where he compiled a 13–6 record. His 1938 team went undefeated at 10–0. From 1939 to 1948, he coached at Mississippi State, where he compiled a 65–19–3 record. In 1940, he was named the SEC Coach of the Year after leading Mississippi State to its only undefeated season in school history. The following year, his squad captured the first and only Southeastern Conference championship in program history. He retired from coaching in 1948 after being fired by Mississippi State's athletic director, Dudy Noble. His .747 coaching record at Mississippi State rivals some of the winningest coaches in the SEC, such as Bear Bryant, Bob Neyland, Johnny Vaught, and Vince Dooley. However, McKeen only coached in Starkville for nine years, while the other leaders on the SEC's wins list coached for more than 15 years.

At the time of his departure from Starkville, McKeen was the winningest coach in Mississippi State history, a rank he would keep until Jackie Sherrill passed him during the 2000 season. McKeen is now third on the school's all-time wins list, behind Sherrill and Dan Mullen.

Late life and honors
After retiring from coaching, McKeen served as the director of the Blue–Gray Football Classic. He was inducted into the Mississippi Sports Hall of Fame in 1977.

Head coaching record

References

External links
 

1905 births
1978 deaths
American football ends
American football guards
American men's basketball players
Memphis Tigers football coaches
Mississippi State Bulldogs football coaches
Tennessee Volunteers football players
Tennessee Volunteers basketball players
All-Southern college football players
College Football Hall of Fame inductees
People from Fulton, Kentucky